Aktueller Software Markt (literally Current Software Market), commonly known by its acronym, ASM, was a German multi-platform video game magazine that was published by Tronic-Verlag from 1986 until 1995. It was one of the first magazines published in Germany focused on video games, though the first issues of ASM covered the software market in general for almost all platforms at this time, hence the magazine's full name. According to the magazine itself, it was the first computer software journal in Germany. However, it soon evolved into a video game magazine.

The first issue was published in March 1986, issue 2/1995 was the last issue. From the first issue until ASM 9/1991, Manfred Kleimann was the magazine's chief editor, then he was replaced by Matthias Siegk. With issue 5/1993, Peter Schmitz took the place of the chief editor until the last ASM.

During the last years of the ASM'''s history, the name was changed two times. With issue 12/1993, the magazine was renamed ASM – Das Spaß-Magazin, meaning "ASM – The Fun Magazine". Another name change occurred with issue 11/1994, now the magazine's full name was ASM – Das Computer-Spaß-Magazin'', literally "ASM – The Computer Fun Magazine", which was used until the last issue.

References

External links 
Covers and scans at Kultboy.com 
Covers and scans at Kultpower.de 
Interview with Manfred Kleimann from March 2005 
Archived Aktueller Software Markt Magazines on the Internet Archive

1986 establishments in West Germany
1995 disestablishments in Germany
Defunct computer magazines
Defunct magazines published in Germany
Computer magazines published in Germany
German-language magazines
Video game magazines published in Germany
Magazines established in 1986
Magazines disestablished in 1995
Mass media in Kassel